The Money Maniac is a 1921 American silent drama film directed by Léonce Perret and starring Robert Elliott, Henry G. Sell and Marcya Capri.

Cast
 Robert Elliott as Didier Bouchard 
 Henry G. Sell as Milo d'Espail 
 Marcya Capri as Rolande Garros 
 Lucy Fox as Thérèse Garros 
 Ivo Dawson as Joe Hoggart 
 Eugène Bréon as Bill Shopps

References

Bibliography
 Larry Langman. Destination Hollywood: The Influence of Europeans on American Filmmaking. McFarland, 2000.

External links

1921 films
1921 drama films
Silent American drama films
Films directed by Léonce Perret
American silent feature films
1920s English-language films
Pathé Exchange films
American black-and-white films
1920s American films